Rommel Cariño Padilla (born January 4, 1965) is a Filipino actor, model, businessman, politician, and movie producer.

Early life
He was born to late Governor Roy Padilla Sr. and actress Eva Cariño.

Padilla's siblings from the same parents are: Royette Padilla, BB Gandanghari, and Robin Padilla.

Personal life
Rommel is married to Anabelle Antonio of Angeles, Pampanga whom he had children with, RJ Padilla, Matt Padilla, and Roanna Padilla. While Rommel was in jail and appealing his case in late 1998, Anabelle had to work for their children on his behalf. She was a bassist in Japan while their children was in Rommel's sister, Rowena Padilla's care in Kidapawan, Mindanao for six years.

The teen-idol, musician, and actor Daniel Padilla is Padilla's son with singer-actress Karla Estrada. On a 1990 day, Rommel met Karla Estrada (who he still calls "Ling") at the Viva Office at work. The next day, they're on, Karla said.
 Rommel in prison, Karla gave birth to Daniel and took their child for him to see for the first time after 3 years.

“Muslim ako like Robin, ‘di ba? Kaya pwede akong mag-asawa ng higit sa isa. I married Daniel's mom. Si Robin pa ang nagkasal sa amin,"
(I'm a Muslim just like Robin [Padilla], am I not? That allows me to marry more than one woman. I married Daniel's mom [Karla], and it was Robin who wed us.) – Rommel Padilla

Rommel is said to be friends with his wives, and his children from them has no friction as they treat each other "whole" brothers/sisters, not "half".

Imprisonment
On October 27, 1996 at around 10:30 pm, in front of a convenience store at the intersection of Ortigas Avenue Extension and De Castro Avenue in Brgy. Sta. Lucia, Pasig, Padilla, and his flight steward friend Frederick Luna were arrested by East Police District-Drug Enforcement Unit.

The policemen had just finished a drug bust operation when they found a .45 caliber handgun tucked in Luna's waistband. 100 grams of dried marijuana leaves was also found on him. Padilla got off his Nissan Sentra car to reportedly intervene for his friend's release. The lawmen searched his car and found in the passenger seat the .22 Magnum machine pistol that caused them to charge him of illegal possession of firearms. Padilla told police he was on his way to shoot scenes for his upcoming movie Dimas at Magdalena in that night when they stopped by the store.

On October 29, 1996, Padilla was released after posting a Php 120,000 bail. He was accompanied by: his mother, Eva Carino; his girlfriend at the time, Jean Garcia; and his other relatives.

On November 12, 1996, the Pasig Regional Trial Court ruled Padilla's right for the 45-day reinvestigation of the charges after the motion was filed by Robert Padilla, his counsel and elder brother based on his client's inquest without their counter-affidavit. Luna's defending lawyer Rene Saquisag stressed his client's innocence by stating that the arresting policemen had "planted" the evidence against them.

On May 20, 1998, Judge Esperanza Fabon-Victorino of the Pasig Regional Trial Court convicted and sentenced Padilla to 8 years imprisonment at the New Bilibid Prison in Muntinglupa for illegal possession of firearms and ammunition. He went into hiding after the fact but eventually surrendered on June 2, 1998 accompanied by his younger brother Robin Padilla and fellow actor George Estregan. His lawyers believed he will not go to jail if he surrenders himself before June 4 to file a notice of appeal before the Court of Appeals but the same ruling judge Victorino denied them for Padilla's violation of the conditions for his bail, and for not appearing in court despite due notice. Padilla's fugitive status while he went into hiding shortly before he was sentenced did not help secure his motion for bail.

While in jail, reports said that he slashed his wrists at his cell to attempt suicide.

On February 19, 1999, while serving time in the New Bilibid Prisons and appealing his conviction, he was released for Php 150,000 bail allowed by the Court of Appeals. Again, his mother, Eva Carino took him home after saying "I will will [sic] make sure that Rommel will not be involved in any trouble while he is out of jail,". Padilla said he wishes to do movies again and dedicate his time for family.

Political career
His political inclinations can be traced from his grandfather, José Padilla Sr., former governor of Bulacan province, Philippines, and his father, Casimero (Roy) Padilla Sr., former governor of Camarines Norte province.

Padilla was elected Nueva Ecija Provincial Board member in 2007.

In 2010, he ran for the vice governorship of Nueva Ecija under the local party Bagong Lakas ng Nueva Ecija (BALANE), but lost to Gay "GP" Padiernos.

Once again, in 2016, ran under BALANE party, he was elected as senior board member of the province's First District.

He also ran twice in failed bids to represent the First District in the Congress. Being an independent candidate in 2019, he lost to his lone opponent, then-incumbent Rep. Estrellita "Ging" Suansing.

In the 2022 national elections, Padilla, ran under PDP–Laban, and his another opponent, former Philippine Charity Sweepstakes Office chief Alexander Balutan, were both defeated by outgoing Rep. Estrellita's daughter, Mika Suansing.

Filmography

Television

Movies

References

1965 births
Living people
People from Nueva Ecija
Filipino actor-politicians
Filipino male television actors
PDP–Laban politicians
Filipino people of Spanish descent
Filipino male comedians
Rommel
Filipino male film actors